Paul Mellon (June 11, 1907 – February 1, 1999) was an American philanthropist and an owner/breeder of thoroughbred racehorses.  He is one of only five people ever designated an "Exemplar of Racing" by the National Museum of Racing and Hall of Fame. He was co-heir to one of America's greatest business fortunes, derived from the Mellon Bank created by his grandfather Thomas Mellon, his father Andrew W. Mellon, and his father's brother Richard B. Mellon. In 1957, when Fortune prepared its first list of the wealthiest Americans, it estimated that Paul Mellon, his sister Ailsa Mellon-Bruce, and his cousins Sarah Mellon and Richard King Mellon, were all among the richest eight people in the United States, with fortunes of between 400 and 700 million dollars each (around $ and $ in today's dollars).

Mellon's autobiography, Reflections in a Silver Spoon, was published in 1992. He died at his home, Oak Spring, in Upperville, Virginia, on February 1, 1999. He was survived by his wife, Rachel (a.k.a. Bunny), his children, Catherine Conover (first wife of John Warner) and Timothy Mellon, and two stepchildren, Stacy Lloyd III and Eliza, Viscountess Moore.

Biography
Paul Mellon was the son of Andrew W. Mellon, US Secretary of the Treasury from 1921 to 1932, and Nora McMullen of Hertfordshire, England and brother of Ailsa Mellon-Bruce. When he was 5 years old his parent divorced. He graduated from The Choate School (now Choate Rosemary Hall) in Wallingford, Connecticut, in 1925, where he wrote for the literary magazine. He then went on to graduate from Yale College and the University of Cambridge. At Yale, he was a member of Chi Psi fraternity, Scroll and Key and served as vice-chairman of the Yale Daily News. He was a great benefactor of his alma maters, donating to the Forbes-Mellon Library at the University of Cambridge, the Mellon Arts Center and the Mellon (now Icahn) Science Center to Choate, two residential colleges, and the Yale Center for British Art.

After graduating from Yale, he went to England to study at the University of Cambridge, receiving a BA in 1931, while his father served as the US Ambassador to the Court of St. James's from 1932 to 1933. In 1930, he was a founding member, alongside Sir Timothy William Gowers, of the CRABS, the Clare Rugby And Boating Society (the oldest of the collegiate Gentlemen's societies still active). In 1938, he received an Oxbridge MA from Clare College, Cambridge. He was a major benefactor to Clare College's Forbes-Mellon Library, opened in 1986.

Marriage and military service

Mellon returned to Pittsburgh, to work for Mellon Bank and other businesses for six months. In 1935, he married Mary Conover Brown and the couple, who had two children, Catherine and Timothy, moved to Virginia.

He enrolled at St. John's College in Annapolis, Maryland in 1940 but six months later joined the United States Army, asking to join the cavalry. Mellon served with the Morale Operations Branch of the  Office of Strategic Services in Europe. He rose to the rank of major and was the recipient of four battle stars in the European Theatre of Operations.

After his wife Mary's death in 1946 from an asthma attack, he married Rachel Lambert Lloyd, known as "Bunny", the former wife of Stacy Barcroft Lloyd Jr. She was a descendant of the Lambert family who formulated and marketed Listerine and an heiress to the Warner-Lambert corporate fortune (Warner-Lambert is now part of Pfizer, following a 2000 merger). Bunny Mellon was an avid horticulturist and gardener, whose fondness for French Impressionist and Post-Impressionist painting, as well as American art, Mellon came to share. By this marriage, he had two stepchildren: Stacy Lloyd III and Eliza Lambert Lloyd (d. 2008; who married and divorced Viscount Moore).

Art collection
While Mellon did not share his father's interest in business, the two found common ground in their love of art and philanthropy. Shortly before Andrew Mellon's death in 1937, construction began on the West Building of the National Gallery of Art in Washington, D.C., for which Andrew Mellon had provided funds. Four years later Paul Mellon presented both the building by John Russell Pope and his father's collection of 115 paintings to the nation. He served on the museum's board for more than four decades: as trustee, as president (twice), as board chair, and as honorary trustee. Mellon commissioned I. M. Pei to build the East Building and, with his sister Ailsa, provided funds for its construction in the late 1970s. Over the years he and his wife Bunny donated more than 1,000 works to the National Gallery of Art, among them many French and American masterworks.

In 1936, Mellon purchased his first British painting, Pumpkin with a Stable-lad by George Stubbs, who became a lifetime favorite of Mellon's.  Beginning in the late 1950s, with the help of English art historian Basil Taylor, Mellon amassed a major collection by the mid-1960s.  London art dealer Geoffrey Agnew once said of his acquisitions: "It took an American collector to make the English look again at their own paintings."  Mellon's collection was catalogued by Dudley Snelgrove and Judy Egerton.

Mellon granted his extensive collection of British art, rare books, and related materials to Yale University in the 1960s, along with the funding to create an appropriate museum to house it (designed by Louis Kahn).  He characteristically insisted that it not be named in honor of him, but rather would be called the Yale Center for British Art, to encourage others to support it as well.  Mellon also provided extensive endowment support to fund not only operations but also an ongoing program of acquisitions, and he made a generous bequest to the Center at the time of his death. The Paul Mellon Centre for Studies in British Art was founded in 1970 through a generous grant to Yale University, as a London-based affiliate of the New Haven center, to encourage study of British art and culture both at the undergraduate and the research scholar levels.

Mellon also provided important leadership gifts to the Virginia Museum of Fine Arts in Richmond, Virginia, as well as Choate Rosemary Hall.

Rokeby Stables
Mellon owned many thoroughbred horses under his Rokeby Stables, including Kentucky Derby winner Sea Hero. Two of his horses, Arts and Letters and Fort Marcy, were named American Horse of the Year in 1969 and 1970 respectively. Both are inductees in the National Museum of Racing and Hall of Fame. He also owned three European champions, Mill Reef { Forrest Flower } and Gold and Ivory. Mill Reef was the #8 rated horse in the world for the 20th Century in A Century of Champions, by John Randall and Tony Morris. Mellon won the Eclipse Award for Outstanding Breeder in 1971 and again in 1986.

Establishment of philanthropic foundations
Mellon established the Old Dominion Foundation in 1941 and the Bollingen Foundation in 1945, both to support advancement and learning of the humanities and liberal education. The Bollingen Foundation published over 100 books before closing in 1969, the same year the assets of the Old Dominion Foundation were merged into those of his sister Ailsa's Avalon Foundation. The combined organization was renamed The Andrew W. Mellon Foundation in honor of their father.

Yale University
Paul Mellon's foremost philanthropic interest was his alma mater, Yale University. His most generous and well-known gifts established the Yale Center for British Art, but his legacy makes itself felt across the campus.

Mellon's other major gift was to provide extensive funding to support the creation of two new undergraduate residential colleges at Yale, Ezra Stiles College and Morse College. Designed by Eero Saarinen, these colleges along with the Kahn-designed British Art Center demonstrated Mellon's commitment to bringing modern architecture to Yale. Perhaps most importantly, the additional undergraduate capacity that these colleges provided were a critical prerequisite to the ability of the university to transition to co-education.

Beyond these capital gifts, Mellon endowed the deanships of each of Yale's 12 residential colleges. He created the Mellon Senior Forum program, which provides a weekly meal for seniors in each of the residential colleges where they can share progress on their senior essays and projects with one another.

Mellon was active in the humanities at Yale. He provided the funding necessary to create the Directed Studies program of intense freshman-year focus on the humanities. He supported significantly the undergraduate theater studies program, and endowed named professorships in schools throughout the University, particularly in the humanities.

Other philanthropy
Mellon was highly supportive of causes that advanced the preservation of horses, including the Grayson-Jockey Club Research Foundation. That organization allocates grants towards specific research projects for the safety, welfare, longevity and improvement of life for racehorses.

He donated the $1 million bonus that Sea Hero won in the Chrysler Triple Crown Challenge to the United States Jockey Club's Grayson-Jockey Club Research Foundation. Furthermore, he requested that double that amount be raised in response to his donation. That goal was met during the 1995–1996 fiscal year. Upon his death, he left yet another $2.5 million to the Foundation's endowment.

In 1999, Paul Mellon bequeathed $8 million to the University of Cambridge in England for the Fitzwilliam Museum. During his lifetime he agreed that £1 million of that sum could be allocated to the museum's courtyard development and, under the terms of his will, following his death in 1999, his executors subsequently allocated a further $12.5 million to complete the renovations associated with the courtyard, including the re-lighting of all of the museum's galleries. The remaining balance was added to the Paul Mellon Fund which was established as a trust fund for the museum at the time of the bequest, the income from which is being used to support education, exhibitions and publications.

He also helped to buy the 28,625-acre Cape Hatteras National Seashore and the 1,500-acre Sky Meadows State Park in the Blue Ridge Mountains of Virginia, where he used to go to look at the stars.

He was also a major benefactor of Clare College and Clare Hall, both in Cambridge, England. Indeed, Clare Hall, founded 1966, gains much from his benefaction; his generous bequest serves the intellectual needs of the graduate college members. The Mellon Fellowship is another example of his generosity, permitting the reciprocal exchange of two students from Yale and two from Clare College for graduate study in each other's institutions.

He developed his great love of England and English culture while studying at Clare College from 1929-1931. "It was while I was at Cambridge that I embarked on the dangerous seas of collecting", Paul Mellon once said—a statement by the man who described himself as "the incurable collector" that has had profound implications for his major beneficiaries, both in the US and the UK.

Mellon helped to arrange the merger of the Mellon Institute of Industrial Research, founded by his father Andrew W. Mellon and uncle Richard B. Mellon with Andrew Carnegie's Carnegie Institute of Technology in 1967 to create Carnegie Mellon University in Pittsburgh. Additionally, he donated substantial funds to Carnegie Mellon.

Honors and awards

Paul Mellon was a trustee of the National Museum of Racing and Hall of Fame and one of the only five people ever designated an "Exemplar of Racing" by the Hall of Fame. He was also inducted into the Virginia Sports Hall of Fame and the English Jockey Club Hall of Fame.

Among honors, he was elected to the American Philosophical Society in 1971, created an Honorary Knight Commander of the Most Excellent Order of the British Empire (KBE) in 1974, awarded the National Medal of Arts in 1985, elected a member of the American Academy of Arts and Sciences in 1992, and awarded the National Medal of Arts and Humanities in 1997.

In 1978, Mellon received the S. Roger Horchow Award for Greatest Public Service by a Private Citizen, an award given out annually by Jefferson Awards.

Quotations
"I have been an amateur in every phase of my life; an amateur poet, an amateur scholar, an amateur horseman, an amateur farmer, an amateur soldier, an amateur connoisseur of art, an amateur publisher, and an amateur museum executive. The root of the word "amateur" is the Latin word for love, and I can honestly say that I've thoroughly enjoyed all the roles I have played." —Paul Mellon from his autobiography Reflections in a Silver Spoon.

News stories
Paul Mellon remembered by the National Gallery of Art

References

External links
National Gallery of Art: Paul Mellon Remembered
"Reflections in a Silver Spoon: on the Life of Paul Mellon", Yale Bulletin & Calendar, 27:20 February 8–15, 1999
Paul Mellon at the Yale University Center for British Art
Paul Mellon at the Virginia Museum of Fine Arts
Paul Mellon's Personal Library at the University of Virginia
Paul Mellon at The National Sporting Library
Paul Mellon at the Virginia Sports Hall of Fame
 Patrick Ward, Donations Need Not Have Name Attached, Yale Daily News, November 7, 2006, yaledailynews.com
 David Cannadine, Mellon: An American Life, Knopf, 2006, 
Grayson-Jockey Club Research Foundation, Inc. - History
 Celebrating Paul Mellon, at the Virginia Museum of Fine Art
Michael Glover. 2007-09-22. The Times. "Paul Mellon’s Legacy: A Passion for British Art". Retrieved 2007-12-03.
 Francis Marion Bush, Paul Mellon:Visionary of the Turf, North Charleston, S.C., BookSurge Publ, 2006,
 Bowen, Edward L. Legacies of the Turf: A Century of Great Thoroughbred Breeders (2003) Eclipse Press 
 
The Bollingen Foundation Collection From the Library of Congress

 

1907 births
1999 deaths
Choate Rosemary Hall alumni
Yale College alumni
United States Army personnel of World War II
American racehorse owners and breeders
Owners of Epsom Derby winners
Eclipse Award winners
American philanthropists
American art collectors
United States National Medal of Arts recipients
Honorary Knights Commander of the Order of the British Empire
Sportspeople from Pittsburgh
People from Upperville, Virginia
Mellon family
Fellows of Clare Hall, Cambridge
Alumni of Clare College, Cambridge
American people of Scotch-Irish descent
National Humanities Medal recipients
Owners of Prix de l'Arc de Triomphe winners
People of the Office of Strategic Services
United States Army officers
Honorary Fellows of the British Academy
Members of the American Philosophical Society